Münster Osnabrück International Airport , Flughafen Münster/Osnabrück in German, is a minor international airport in the German state of North Rhine-Westphalia. The airport serves the area of the northern Ruhrgebiet, western and southwestern Lower Saxony, Emsland, Westphalia and parts of the Netherlands and features flights to some European city and leisure destinations.

History

Early years
On 21 December 1966 the cities of Münster, Osnabrück, and Greven as well as the districts of Münster and Tecklenburg founded the Münster/Osnabrück Airport GmbH.

In mid 1967 the German authorities approached the British Army for assistance in building an airfield to serve the Münster-Osnabrück area. An airstrip existed at Greven, but the site was heavily wooded and included one badly drained and swampy area, and was within a few hundred metres of the Dortmund-Ems Canal which had been bombed during World War Two and where the presence of unexploded bombs was suspected. By March 1968 it was agreed that the British Army would clear and level an area 2120 metres long between 400 and 500 metres wide and produce a base of clean sand 1520 metres long and 50 metres wide, for a runway to be used by aircraft of Trident and BAC 1-11 size. Work began in April 1968. 16 Field Squadron Royal Engineers (RE) provided the project control and RE units from all over the British Army of the Rhine (BAOR) but particularly 43 Field Support Squadron RE provided manpower and plant.

On 24 September 1968 the state of North Rhine-Westphalia received permission to begin construction. The ground levelling was performed by BAOR.

Despite many problems the project was completed on 30 June 1969, within a few days of the planned date. As a gesture to recognise the British Army involvement the Germans gifted a Ka 7 glider to the regiment and gave them honorary membership of the Greven Gliding club. After five years of construction the Münster/Osnabrück airport was officially opened on 27 March 1972.

The first charter flight from Münster/Osnabrück airport to Palma de Mallorca took place in 1973.

Development since the 1980s
On 29 October 1984 British Airways started to serve the route from Berlin to Münster/Osnabrück with BAC Super One-Eleven; these were the first scheduled jet flights from the airport. Münster/Osnabrück gained the status of an international airport in 1986.

A new terminal building that could accommodate a larger number of passengers was inaugurated in 1995; the new Terminal 2 followed in 2002.

The plan was the focus of protests from environmentalists, because the expansion would damage the Eltingmühlenbach natural area. This would have cost around €60 million. The plan was approved in 2004. Originally, work was scheduled to begin in December 2006. However, among others Naturschutzbund Deutschland filed a lawsuit against the expansion. In May 2011 the Higher Administrative Court in Münster decided against the expansion because of mistakes made in the Planfeststellungsverfahren, which describes the plans of the runway expansion.

The plan to connect the airport with the Bundesautobahn 1 was realized in November 2010.

This met with protests as well, because this plan would endanger the Hüttruper Heide heath.

Facilities
The airport has one modern passenger terminal building, which is divided into Terminal 1 for arrivals and Terminal 2 for departures. The ground level has check-in facilities as well as travel agencies, the upper level has the airside area as well as some shops and restaurants and a visitors terrace. The apron is equipped with five aircraft stands which are equipped with jet bridges and can be used by mid-sized planes such as the Boeing 737 and Airbus 320 family, up to the Boeing 757. There are also several bus-boarding stands on the apron.

Airlines and destinations
The following airlines operate regular scheduled and charter flights at Münster Osnabrück International Airport:

Statistics

Ground transportation

Car
The airport has roughly 7500 parking spaces spread over multiple car parks, two of which are multi-storey. The airport can be reached via two motorways: 
A 1 from Bremen/Osnabrück: Exit 75 Flughafen Münster/Osnabrück
A 30 from Amsterdam/Rheine: Exit 11b Ibbenbüren

Bus
There are several scheduled bus connections from Münster railway station and by a coach shuttle from Osnabrück. The coaches take approximately 40 minutes to get from the airport to the railway station

See also
 Transport in Germany
 List of airports in Germany

References

External links

 Official website 
 
 

Airports in North Rhine-Westphalia
Airports established in 1969
Buildings and structures in North Rhine-Westphalia
Osnabrück
Münster